Quentin Poling (born August 17, 1994) is an American football linebacker for the Birmingham Stallions of the United States Football League (USFL). He played college football at Ohio.

Early years
Poling attended Elida High School in Elida, Ohio.

College career
Poling played college football at Ohio University. He was a team captain and a first-team All-MAC selection. In his Senior year, Poling became Ohio University's all-time leader in both Solo Tackles (219) and Tackles for Loss (45).

Professional career

Miami Dolphins
Poling was drafted by the Miami Dolphins in the seventh round, 227th overall, of the 2018 NFL Draft. He was waived on September 1, 2018 and was signed to the practice squad the next day. He signed a reserve/future contract with the Dolphins on January 1, 2019. He was waived/injured by the during final roster cuts on August 31, 2019, and reverted to the team's injured reserve list after clearing waivers on September 1. He was waived from injured reserve with an injury settlement on September 4.

Oakland Raiders
On September 25, 2019, Poling was signed to the Oakland Raiders practice squad. He was promoted to the active roster on November 7, 2019, but was waived two days later and re-signed to the practice squad. He was released on December 4, 2019.

Atlanta Falcons
On December 10, 2019, Poling was signed to the Atlanta Falcons practice squad. His practice squad contract with the team expired on January 6, 2020.

Las Vegas Raiders
On February 6, 2020, Poling was signed by the Las Vegas Raiders. He was waived on May 5, 2020.

Minnesota Vikings
Poling was signed by the Minnesota Vikings on August 8, 2020. He was waived/injured on August 17, 2020, and subsequently reverted to the team's injured reserve list the next day. He was waived on September 2, 2020.

New Orleans Saints
On May 16, 2021, Poling signed with the New Orleans Saints. He was waived/injured on August 13, 2021 and placed on injured reserve. He was waived on August 21.

Birmingham Stallions
Poling signed with the Birmingham Stallions of the United States Football League on May 20, 2022, and was subsequently moved to the inactive roster.

References

External links
Ohio Bobcats bio

1994 births
Living people
People from Allen County, Ohio
Players of American football from Ohio
American football linebackers
Ohio Bobcats football players
Miami Dolphins players
Oakland Raiders players
Atlanta Falcons players
Las Vegas Raiders players
Minnesota Vikings players
New Orleans Saints players
Birmingham Stallions (2022) players